Anthurium tenuifolium is a species of plant in the family Araceae. It is endemic to Ecuador.  Its natural habitats are subtropical or tropical moist lowland forests and subtropical or tropical moist montane forests. It is threatened by habitat loss.

References

Endemic flora of Ecuador
tenuifolium
Endangered plants
Taxonomy articles created by Polbot